Dichomeris ventrella is a moth of the family Gelechiidae. It was described by Asa Fitch in 1854. It is found in North America, where it has been recorded from Maine to Florida, west to Texas, Oklahoma, Kansas, Wisconsin and southern Arizona.

The wingspan is about 17 mm. The forewings are pale cinereous with a faint reddish tinge. The hindwings are shining pale grayish.

The larvae feed on Castanea dentata, Betula, Carpinus, Corylus, Carya and Quercus species. They roll the leaves of their host plant.

References

ventrella
Moths described in 1854